Ramila acciusalis is a moth in the family Crambidae. It was described by Francis Walker in 1859. It is found in China (Jiangxi, Fujian, Hainan, Yunnan, Xizang), India, Sri Lanka and on Borneo.

Description
The wingspan is 26 mm. Membrane of the forewings non-crenulate, where the costal fascia more orange. Line are also orange. The medial line arising from the spot at middle of cell. A single discocellular lunule can be seen. Postmedial line excurved to outer angle. The marginal line more maculate (spotted).

References

Moths described in 1859
Schoenobiinae